The list of those invited to join the Academy of Motion Picture Arts and Sciences as members in 2008.

Actors
 Sacha Baron Cohen
 Josh Brolin
 Marion Cotillard
 Ruby Dee
 Allison Janney
 Jet Li
 Ray Winstone

Animators
David Bowers
Ash Brannon
Doug Cooper
Jeremy Lasky
Caroline Leaf
David Schaub
David Silverman
Suzie Templeton

At-Large
Jim Houston
Neil Machlis
Sheila Nevins

Casting directors
Ronna Kress

Costume designers
Isis Mussenden

Cinematographers
Jonathan W. Brown
Clark Mathis
Kramer Morgenthau
J. Michael Muro
Tim Orr
Tom Richmond

Directors
Sergei Bodrov
James Gray
Michael Haneke
Doug Liman
Kimberly Peirce
Peyton Reed
Jason Reitman
Walter Salles
Gore Verbinski

Documentary
Nanette Burstein
Heidi Ewing
Liz Garbus
Michèle Ohayon
Deborah Shaffer

Executives
Alan Bergman
Dana Goldberg
Sidney Kimmel
Chris S. LeRoy
Andrew Rona
Jeff Skoll

Film editors
Barry Alexander Brown
John Carnochan
John Gilroy
Mark Livolsi
Dylan Tichenor
Juliette Welfling

Live action short filmmakers
Philippe Pollet-Villard

Makeup and hairstylists
Jan Archibald
Kate Biscoe
Didier Lavergne
Christien Tinsley

Music
Glen Ballard
J. J. George
Michael Giacchino

Producers
Armyan Bernstein
Jennifer Fox
Lianne Halfon
Hal Lieberman
Andrew Macdonald
Karen Murphy
Peter R. Newman
JoAnne Sellar

Production designers
Jack Fisk
Clayton R. Hartley

Public relations
Stephanie Allen
Suzanne Fritz
Kevin Goetz
Stephanie Kluft
Tim Palen
Marc Weinstock

Set decorators
Larry Dias
Katie Spencer
Sandy Reynolds Wasco

Stunt coordinators
Melissa R. Stubbs

Sound
Craig Berkey
Fernando Cámara
David Giammarco
Mike Hopkins
Robert J. Kizer
Alyson Dee Moore
Mark Onks
Jon Taylor

Visual effects
Nick Davis
Brian Gernand
Dan Glass
Bryan Grill
Edward T. Hirsh
Helena Packer
Kelly Port
Ted Rae
Doug Roble
Carey Villegas

Writers
Judd Apatow
David Benioff
Jean-Claude Carrière
Diablo Cody
Tamara Jenkins
Jeff Nathanson
Nancy Oliver

References

2008
Invitees,2008